Horodnytsia is an urban-type settlement in Zhytomyr Oblast, Ukraine. Population:  In 2001, population was 5,604.

References

Urban-type settlements in Zviahel Raion
Novograd-Volynsky Uyezd